Roberto Caracciolo of Lecce (c.1425 – 6 May 1495) was a Franciscan friar, one of the most famous Italian preachers of his time.

Works

References

Further reading
 
 

1425 births
1495 deaths
Italian Friars Minor
15th-century Italian Christian monks
Franciscan writers